APV was the name of a company making process equipment, and remains as a brand name.

History
It was founded in 1910 as the Aluminium Plant & Vessel Company Limited, fabricating equipment for breweries and vegetable oil in Wandsworth.  In the 1950s it moved to Crawley and expanded considerably, under the name A.P.V. Co. Ltd.  In 1967 it acquired Kestner Evaporator and Engineering Co, another major process plant manufacturer.

Continuing expansion led to a works of 1600 employees under the name APV International, supplying equipment services to the dairy, food and chemical industries by 1984. In addition a foundry employing 350 people named APV Paramount made high alloy steels and Vent-Axia a subsidiary company making fans, were near by.
In 1987 it merged with Baker Perkins to become APV Baker, later shortened to APV.  The two manufacturing arms remained physically separate and the APV section was acquired by Siebe plc in 1997.  After the merger of Siebe with BTR plc, APV was acquired by SPX Corporation in 2007 where it remains as a brand name for pumps, valves, heat exchangers, mixers and homogenizers in the process industries.

References

Further reading

Manufacturing companies established in 1910
Defunct manufacturing companies of the United Kingdom
Companies based in Crawley
Chemical engineering
1910 establishments in England